The Edward Dickinson House is a historic house at 672 East Boswell Street in Batesville, Arkansas.  It is a -story wood-frame structure, with a steeply pitched gable roof and Gothic Revival styling.  A front-facing gable is centered on the main facade, with a Gothic-arched window at its center.  The single-story porch extending across the front is supported by chamfered posts and has a jigsawn balustrade.  Built about 1875, it is one of the city's few surviving 19th-century Gothic houses, a style that is somewhat rare in the state.

The house was listed on the National Register of Historic Places in 1986.

See also
National Register of Historic Places listings in Independence County, Arkansas

References

Houses on the National Register of Historic Places in Arkansas
Gothic Revival architecture in Arkansas
Houses completed in 1875
Houses in Batesville, Arkansas
National Register of Historic Places in Independence County, Arkansas
1875 establishments in Arkansas